The Unión de Trabajadores de la Industria Eléctrica y Riego (UTIER) —English: Electrical Industry and Irrigation Workers Union— is one of the labor unions that represents workers from the Puerto Rico Electric Power Authority. The union was founded on May 3, 1942 by thirty seven linemen in San Juan, Puerto Rico. At some point it was affiliated with the Free Federation of Workers and the American Federation of Labor and Congress of Industrial Organizations but it eventually unaffiliated and became independent. Today, the union represents about 4,800 workers.

External links
 utier.org - official site

References

1942 establishments in Puerto Rico
Trade unions in Puerto Rico
Trade unions established in 1942
Electricians' trade unions
Organizations based in San Juan, Puerto Rico
Energy in Puerto Rico